Daniel Deasy is a Democratic member of the Pennsylvania House of Representatives. Deasy graduated from Bishop Canevin High School and attended the University of Pittsburgh. He worked as a foreman for the Pittsburgh Department of Public Works before running for Pittsburgh City Council. Deasy is also currently chairman of the Pittsburgh Water and Sewer Authority.

Committee assignments 

 Liquor Control, Democratic Chair

References

External links

Pennsylvania House of Representatives - Daniel Deasy (Democrat) official PA House website
Pennsylvania House Democratic Caucus - Daniel Deasy official Party website

Living people
Democratic Party members of the Pennsylvania House of Representatives
21st-century American politicians
1966 births